Home for Life, the founding documentary of Kartemquin Films released in 1967, depicts the experiences of two elderly people in their first month at a home for the aged. One is a woman whose struggle to remain useful in her son and daughter-in-law's home is no longer appreciated. The other is a widower, without a family, who suddenly realizes he can no longer take care of himself. The film offers an unblinking look at the feelings of the two new residents in their encounters with other residents, medical staff, social workers, psychiatrists and family.

Winning the Chicago Award at the Chicago International Film Festival, as well as being an Official Selection at both the New York Film Festival and Edinburgh Film Festival, Kartemquin recently restored Home for Life and made their landmark film available to own on DVD.

See also
List of American films of 1967

References

External links
  at Kartemquin Films
 

1967 films
American documentary films
Documentary films about health care
1967 documentary films
Documentary films about old age
Kartemquin Films films
1960s American films